The Social Security Advisory Committee (SSAC) is a statutory body that provides impartial advice to the UK government on social security issues. When the SSAC reports on government proposals for regulations the report must be presented to Parliament together with the regulations and a statement from the Secretary of State for Work and Pensions responding to any recommendations.

History
The Committee was formed in November 1980 and is now covered by the Social Security Administration Act 1992. It took over the advisory functions of the former Great Britain and Northern Ireland Supplementary Benefits Commissions and the National Insurance Advisory Committee, and also assumed advisory responsibility for family income supplement and child benefit which had not previously come within the scope of any advisory committee. The Social Security and Housing Benefits Act 1982 extended the Committee's responsibilities to cover advice on the new housing benefit scheme, replacing the Advisory Committee on Rent Rebates and Rent Allowances (ACRRRA) from April 1983.

Notable members

Chairs
Paul Gray (2011- )
Deep Sagar (2011)
Sir Richard Tilt (2004-2011)
Sir Thomas Boyd-Carpenter KBE (1995-2004)
Sir Michael Bett CBE (1993-1995)
Sir Peter Barclay (1984-1993)
Sir Arthur Armitage (1980-1984)

Members
Professor Olive Stevenson (1982-2002)

References

External links
 Social Security Advisory Committee website

Politics of the United Kingdom
Law of the United Kingdom